How Can It Be may refer to:

 How Can It Be (album), Lauren Daigle's first studio album
 How Can It Be (EP), Lauren Daigle's first extended play
 "How Can It Be", a song by Reks from the album Grey Hairs